Diocese of Klerksdorp may refer to:

 the Roman Catholic Diocese of Klerksdorp
 the Anglican Diocese of Matlosane, formerly the Diocese of Klerksdorp